Serbia and Montenegro was a confederated union which existed between 2003 and 2006. The two republics initially formed the Federal Republic of Yugoslavia in 1992.

The economy of Serbia and Montenegro entered a prolonged decline in 1989. Exacerbated by the economic embargo imposed during the Bosnian war, the Federal Republic of Yugoslavia (FRY) economy's downward spiral showed no real sign of recovery until 1995. GDP was nowhere near its 1990 level, but the 1999 NATO bombing of Yugoslavia of the basic infrastructure of the country and many factories, as well as a renewed embargo, caused a further huge drop in GDP in relation to the 1991 level. The first sign of an economic recovery occurred in 2001 after the overthrow of Slobodan Milošević on 5 October 2000. A vigorous team of economic reformers worked to tame inflation (non-energy inflation is less than 9% in 2002, down from over 120% two years earlier) and rationalize the Serbia and Montenegro economy. As of January 2005, GDP has recovered to 55-60% of its 1990 level, due to GDP growth of 8.5% in 2004.

Currency Problems
The FRY's monetary unit, the dinar, remained volatile throughout Milošević's rule. Alarmed FRY officials took several steps to tighten monetary policy in 1998, including ruling out a devaluation in the near term, increasing reserve requirements, and issuing bonds. During this period, Montenegro rejected the dinar and adopted the Deutsche Mark (now replaced by the euro) as its official currency. As 1999 began, the damage control operation had succeeded in returning the exchange rate to reasonable levels. However, it was not until 2002, after intense macroeconomic reform measures, that the dinar became convertible—a first since the Bretton Woods Agreements laid out the post-World War II international exchange rate regime.

Stabilization Efforts
Privatization efforts have not succeeded as well as macroeconomic reform. The process of privatization was not popular among workers of large socially owned companies, and many citizens appeared to believe the tendering process was overly centralized and controlled from Belgrade. Furthermore, international investment was lagging in Serbia and Montenegro, as a result of both domestic and international investment climates. Managers tended to blame the dearth of interest on the current negative business climate in Serbia and Montenegro.

Statistics

Gross Domestic Product

Purchasing power parity - $25.98 billion (2004 est.)<, $27.5 Billion predicted for 2005 br>
Real growth rate: 8.5% (2004 est.), 6.5% (2005 est)
Real GDP Per capita - nominal: $2900 (2004 est.), $3200 (2005 est.)
Composition by sector:
Agriculture: 15.2%
Industry: 28.2%
Services: 56.6% (2004 est.)

Economic Situation
Population below poverty line: 10%
Inflation rate (consumer prices): 12-13% (2004 est.) 
Labor force: 3,596,282 (2005 est.)
Budget:
Revenues: $9.773 billion
expenditures: $10.460 billion (2004 est.)

Industrial Situation
Industries:
machine building (aircraft, trucks, and automobiles; tanks and weapons; electrical equipment; agricultural machinery); metallurgy (steel, aluminum, copper, lead, zinc, chromium, antimony, bismuth, cadmium); mining (coal, bauxite, nonferrous ore, iron ore, limestone); consumer goods (textiles, footwear, foodstuffs, appliances); electronics, petroleum products, chemicals, and pharmaceuticals
Industrial production growth rate: 6.5% (2004 est.)

Electricity
Production: 31,710 GWh (2001)
Production by source (2001):
Fossil fuel: 62.9%
Hydro: 37.1%
Nuclear: 0%
Other: 0%
Consumption: 32,370 GWh (2001)
Exports: 446 GWh (2001)
Imports: 3,330 GWh (2001)

Oil
Production:  2001
Consumption:  2001
Exports: NA (2001)
Imports: NA (2001)
Proved reserves:  January 2002

Natural Gas
Proved reserves: 24.07 km³ (January 2002 est.)

Agricultural Produce
Cereals, fruits, vegetables, tobacco, olives; cattle, sheep, goats.

Exports
Total: $5.5 billion f.o.b. (2004 est.)(goods and services)
Commodities: manufactured goods, food and live animals, raw materials
Partners: Bosnia and Herzegovina 19%, Italy 12%, Germany 12%, Republic of Macedonia 8%, Russia 4% (2004)

Imports
Total: $11.5 billion f.o.b. (2004 est.)(goods and services)
Commodities: machinery and transport equipment, fuels and lubricants, manufactured goods, chemicals, food and live animals, raw materials 
Partners: Russia 13%, Germany 13%, Italy 9%, China 5%, USA 4% (2004)

Debt
External: $12.6 billion (2004 est.)
-As a percentage of GDP: 55-60% (2004 est.)
Economic aid - recipient: $2 billion pledged in 2001 (disbursements to follow for several years)

Currency
Serbian dinar (CSD). Note - in Montenegro the euro is legal tender; in Kosovo both the euro and the Yugoslav dinar are legal (2002)
Code: YUM
Exchange rates: Serbian dinars per US dollar - official rate: 60 (2004); 
Fiscal year: calendar year

See also
 Economy of Europe
 Economy of the Socialist Federal Republic of Yugoslavia
 Economy of Montenegro
 Economy of Serbia
 Central Bank of Montenegro
 National Bank of Serbia

External links
 Montenegro Economy>> Financial Business and Economy News from Montenegro

Serbia and Montenegro
Serbia and Montenegro